Torture Taxi: On the Trail of the CIA's Rendition Flights is a 2006 book by A. C. Thompson and Trevor Paglen documenting the CIA's extraordinary rendition program.

The authors note the discovery of the program's means of transportation, rendition aircraft, by aviation enthusiasts, who spotted discrepancies in the flights of four aircraft, and correlations between their unusual flight patterns and the list of sites reputed to be the destination for ghost detainees.

See also
 Aero Contractors (US) reputedly provides air transport services for the Central Intelligence Agency
 Air America former United States civilian airline operated by the Central Intelligence Agency during the Vietnam War
 Extrajudicial detention
 Ghost Plane: The True Story of the CIA Rendition and Torture Program – book by Stephen Grey
 Jeppesen
 Planespotting
 Taxi to the Dark Side – documentary film
 Tepper Aviation
 Traffic analysis

Citations

External links
Excerpt from the book
Paglen's website

2006 non-fiction books
Aviation books